Moresby Island is a large island that forms part of the Haida Gwaii archipelago (formerly known as Queen Charlotte Islands) in British Columbia, Canada, located at . It is separated by the narrow Skidegate Channel from the other principal island of the group to the north, Graham Island.

Gwaii Haanas National Park Reserve and Haida Heritage Site includes Moresby and other islands. The island, together with numerous nearby smaller islands and islets in the southern archipelago, is defined by Statistics Canada as Skeena-Queen Charlotte E (Now North Coast Regional District Area E), with a population of 340 as of the 2016 census. Almost all of its population resided in the unincorporated community of Sandspit, on the northeast corner of Moresby.

Moresby Island is the 175th largest island in the world, and the 32nd largest island in Canada.

On October 27, 2012, an earthquake of magnitude 7.7 (the strongest earthquake in Canada since the 1949 Queen Charlotte Islands earthquake) was epicentred at a depth of  under the island.

Name
Moresby Island is named for Rear Admiral Fairfax Moresby of the Royal Navy, as is the smaller Moresby Island in the Gulf Islands.  The traditional name in the Haida language is Gwaii Haanas, which is the source of the national park name.

References

External links
  Community Profile: Skeena-Queen Charlotte Regional District Electoral Area E, British Columbia; Statistics Canada
  Sandspit unincorporated place, Skeena-Queen Charlotte Regional District Electoral Area E, British Columbia; Statistics Canada
  Sea islands, Natural Resources Canada Atlas of Canada

Islands of Haida Gwaii